Tyler Brockman (born 22 November 2002) is a professional Australian rules footballer with the Hawthorn Football Club in the Australian Football League (AFL).

Early career

Tyler Brockman played his early football with Wembley Downs JFC before moving on to Subiaco colts. Brockman who has indigenous heritage, is also the nephew of former  and Gold Coast player Greg Broughton.

Brockman had developed into an explosive midfielder/forward that had attracted interest from several AFL clubs. Brockman had met with West Coast Eagles who were said to be keen even though they had only late picks in the 2020 draft.  used their pick 46 to secure his services. Brockman was said to be surprised when the Hawks picked him.

AFL career

Brockman settled quickly since arriving at Hawthorn, and shown promise in the practice matches before the 2021 season. In the practice match against  he kicked 3 goals in the first quarter.

Brockman debuted for Hawthorn as part of the trio that debuted in the opening round of the 2021 AFL season against Essendon at Marvel Stadium. He kicked two goals on debut.

Brockman's 2022 season was ruined by injury, it started with soft tissue issues during the pre-season. Once he had recovered from that he was injured in the opening minutes of his first game for Box Hill. He was placed on the long term injury list after he had a shoulder reconstruction surgery in 2022.

Statistics
Updated to the end of the 2022 season.

|-
| 2021 ||  || 42
| 11 || 10 || 4 || 52 || 46 || 98 || 27 || 23 || 0.9 || 0.4 || 4.7 || 4.2 || 8.9 || 2.5 || 2.1 || 0
|-
| 2022 ||  || 33
| 0 || — || — || — || — || — || — || — || — || — || — || — || — || — || — || 0
|- class="sortbottom"
! colspan=3| Career
! 11 !! 10 !! 4 !! 52 !! 46 !! 98 !! 27 !! 23 !! 0.9 !! 0.4 !! 4.7 !! 4.2 !! 8.9 !! 2.5 !! 2.1 !! 0
|}

References

External links

Living people
2002 births
Subiaco Football Club players
Hawthorn Football Club players
Box Hill Football Club players
Indigenous Australian players of Australian rules football
Australian rules footballers from Western Australia